"Escape!" is a science fiction short story by American writer Isaac Asimov.  It was first published as "Paradoxical Escape" (a publisher's change in the title) in the August 1945 issue of Astounding Science Fiction and reprinted as "Escape!" (Asimov's choice of title) in the collections I, Robot (1950) and The Complete Robot (1982).

Plot summary
Many research organizations are working to develop the hyperspatial drive. The company U.S. Robots and Mechanical Men, Inc., is approached by its biggest competitor that has plans for a working hyperspace engine that allows humans to survive the jump (a theme which would be further developed in future Asimov stories). But the staff of U.S. Robots is wary, because, in performing the calculations, their rival's (non-positronic) supercomputer has destroyed itself.

The U.S. Robots and Mechanical Men company finds a way to feed the information to its own positronic computer known as The Brain (which is not a robot in the strictest sense of the word, since it doesn't move, although it does obey the Three Laws of Robotics), without the same thing happening. The Brain then directs the building of a hyperspace ship.

Powell and Donovan board the spaceship, and the spaceship takes off without them being initially aware of it. They also find that The Brain has become a practical joker: it hasn't built any manual controls for the ship, no showers or beds, either, and it only provides tinned beans and milk for the crew to survive on.

Shortly after their journey begins, and after many strange visions by the crew, the ship does safely return to Base after two hyperspace jumps. Dr. Susan Calvin has, by this time, discovered what has happened: any hyperspace jump causes the crew of the ship to cease existing for a brief moment, effectively dying, which is a violation of the First Law of Robotics (albeit a temporary one); the only reason the artificial intelligence of The Brain survives is because Susan reduced the importance of the potential deaths, and descending into irrational, childish behavior (as a means of coping) allows it to find a means for ensuring the survival of the crew.

External links
 
 "Paradoxical Escape" at the Internet Archive

Robot series short stories by Isaac Asimov
1945 short stories
Works originally published in Analog Science Fiction and Fact